Church of St Peter is a  Grade I listed church in Arlesey, Bedfordshire, England. It became a listed building on 31 October 1966.

See also
Grade I listed buildings in Bedfordshire

History
Internal evidence dates the church to originally be from the 12th century, as only a nave. Aisles were later added in the 13th and 14th centuries.

In the 1600s, the original tower collapsed and was replaced by a small wooden belfry for many years.

A nearby building that used to serv as a vestry, chapel and school was demolished in 1855 and replaced by the current vestry.

The current tower was built in 1877.

Architecture
The nave is 64 feet long by 17 feet wide. The chancel adds 16 feet in length with a width of 26 feet. The two aisles add around 10 ft each. The modern tower is around 12 feet square.

References

Church of England church buildings in Bedfordshire
Grade I listed churches in Bedfordshire